La Unión de Isidoro Montes de Oca  is one of the 81 municipalities of Guerrero, in south-western Mexico. The municipal seat lies at La Unión.

As of 2005, the municipality had a total population of 25,230.

The main towns are La Unión, population 3,079; Petacalco, population 2,671; Zacatula, population 1,417; Lagunillas, population 1,371; El Naranjito, population 1,167; and Surcua, population 1,046.

History

On October 26, 1614, the  Dutch Captain Joris van Spilbergen - involved in his country's war with Spain - raided with an expedition of five ships this part of the coast of the then Spanish Mexico. At Zacatula he captured the pearl fishing ship San Francisco.

References

Municipalities of Guerrero